Dorcheh Abed (also Romanized as Dorcheh ‘Abed, Darcheh ‘Abed, Darcheh ‘Ābed, Darcheh-ye ‘Abed, Dorcheh-ye ‘Ābad, and Dorcheh-ye ‘Ābed) is a village in Oshtorjan Rural District, in the Central District of Falavarjan County, Isfahan Province, Iran. At the 2006 census, its population was 976, in 272 families.

References 

Populated places in Falavarjan County